Archibald Bruce (1746–1816), was a Scottish theological writer.

Life
Bruce was born at Broomhall, Stirlingshire, and, after studying at the University of Glasgow, was ordained, in 1768, minister of the Associate (Anti-Burgher) congregation of Whitburn. In 1786 he was appointed professor of divinity by the General Associate Synod, and continued to hold that office till 1806. Being dissatisfied with the action of his synod, he left it and formed, along with Thomas M'Crie the Elder and two others, the 'Auld Licht' Anti-Burgher 'Constitutional Associate Presbytery'. This led to a sentence of deposition being passed on him by the former body. He died 28 February 1816.

Writings
Bruce's major writings were:

 The Kirkiad, or the Golden Age of the Church of Scotland', a satirical poem, 1774.
 Free Thoughts on the Toleration of Popery, 1780. 
 Annus Secularis, the centenary of the revolution 1788, a long dissertation on religious festivals. 
 Queries, on the commemoration of the revolution, 1797. 
 The Catechism modernized, 1791, a cutting satire on lay patronage, and its effects, in the form of a parody on the Westminster Assembly's Shorter Catechism. 
 Reflexions on the Freedom of Writing, 1794, à propos of a proclamation against seditious publications, bearing the motto "What Britons dare to think, he dares to tell".
 A poem ridiculing the pretensions of the pope, 1797. 
 Lectures to Students, 1797. 
 Life of James Hog of Carnock, 1798. 
 Dissertation on the Supremacy of the Civil Power in Matters of Religion, 1798. 
 Poems, serious and amusing, by a reverend divine, 1812. 
 Life of Alex. Morus, a celebrated divine in Geneva and Holland, 1813. 
 A Treatise on Earthquakes'' (posthumous).

References
Citations

Sources

1746 births
1816 deaths
Scottish Christian theologians
Scottish educators
18th-century Scottish poets
19th-century Scottish poets
18th-century Scottish Christian theologians
19th-century Scottish theologians
People from Stirling
Alumni of the University of Glasgow
Ministers of Secession Churches in Scotland